

Season summary 
In order to resolve a lack of goals Torino bought Wim Kieft, who hit the net for several times in every competition. At least in autumn the side paid European efforts, winning only once in Sundays following cup games.

As 1987 begins, UEFA draw coupled Tirol Innsbruck to the side for quarter-finals. First leg ended up in a 0–0 after a match poor of goal opportunities. Torino came to retour challenge in a crisis trend, missing league win from 5 games and goals from 554'. A cold ground, in Austria, hosted the match. Torino stood up at opponent's attacks, finishing the first half without scoring or conceding. As second round started, Tirol went on 1–0 after a quarter: a corner kick originated the goal. With 10 minutes left, Austrian side came to double. Referee was about to blow the end when Francini scored for Torino. The same defender came close to equalizer, but a foul on him was not punished with a penalty (probably because he hit the ball before falling down). European failure could have result in a sacking for Radice who – instead – retained his job.

Squad

Goalkeepers
  Silvano Martina
  Renato Copparoni
  Fabrizio Lorieri

Defenders
  Paolo Beruatto
  Giancarlo Corradini
  Roberto Cravero
  Giacomo Ferri
  Giovanni Francini
  Ezio Rossi

Midfielders
  Paolo Bellatorre
  Antonio Comi
  Giuseppe Dossena
  Diego Fuser
  Júnior
  Gianluigi Lentini
  Danilo Pileggi
  Antonio Sabato
  Renato Zaccarelli

Attackers
  Franco Lerda
  Pietro Mariani
  Wim Kieft

Competitions

Serie A

League table

Matches

Topscorers
8 goals:  Wim Kieft

Coppa Italia

First round

Eightfinals

UEFA Cup 

First round

Second round

Eightfinals

Quarterfinals

References 

Torino F.C. seasons
Torino